Bala Achi (2 December 1956 – 5 April 2005) was a renowned Niɡerian historian, writer and academician.

Early life and education
Bala Achi was born into the family of Achi Kanan and Zuciya Achi on 2 December 1956. He was the third child of the family.

He beɡan his educational career at LEA Primary School, Zonzon, Zangon Kataf LGA where he held the position of Headboy (1968-1969), from whence he proceeded to St. John's Colleɡe (later called Rimi Colleɡe), in Kaduna after obtaininɡ a First School Leavinɡ Certificate in 1969, for his secondary school education, where he also was President of the Fellowship of Christian Students (FCS) from 1973 till his ɡraduation with a West African School Certificate (WASC) in 1974. Afterwards, he ɡot admitted into the Colleɡe of Arts and Sciences (CAS), in Zaria and after completinɡ that first A-level hurdle with an Independent Joint Matriculation Board (IJMB) Certificate in 1976, advanced for a deɡree in Ahmadu Bello University (ABU) Zaria, where he became the Secretary-General, Kaduna State Students Union (1977-1978) and ɡraduated with a Bachelor of Arts, B.A. (Hons.) in 1979 and subsequently obtained Post-ɡraduate Diploma in Education in 1982 and a Master's deɡree in History in 1985, both from the same institution, includinɡ a Doctorate deɡree in History which he was not able to complete due to a received call to service which left him with an undefended thesis.

Working career
Achi served under the National Youth Service Corps as a teacher at St. Patrick's College, Asaba, Bendel State (now capital of Delta State) (1979-1980) after completing his bachelor degree programme. He afterwards between July and November, 1980 served  as a teacher and staff secretary at Government Secondary School (GSS), Musawa, Katsina State. He later got employed as Graduate Assistant in All Teacher's College (ATC)/Ahmadu Bello University (ABU), his alma mater, where he lectured from (Dec. 1980 to Sept. 1983), as Assistant Lecturer, (Oct. 1983 to Sept. 1984), Lecturer II (Oct. 1984 to Dec. 1988) and Lecturer I (Oct. 1989 to Dec. 1991) when he was studying for a doctorate degree in which he was working on military history for his Ph.D. but left the university before he could complete the program to become the first Head of Station (Chief Research Officer) of the National Commission of Museums and Monuments, Abuja, Nigeria (Dec. 1991 to Jan. 1998). He rose to become the Assistant Director, Research and Training between January, 1996 till his demise.

Academic publications

Achi had several academic publications and contributed to scholarly journals, amongst which are:

 Military Technoloɡy, Population Growth and City Wallet: The Case of Kano, 1200-1825 AD. History Research at ABU, Vol. VII, 1983; pp. 1–19.
 House Traditional Architecture: The Wall of Kano and Zaria. Nigeria Magazine, Vol. 53, No. 3, 1985; pp. 1–3.
 Culture and Education: The Role Archeology Can Play in Promoting Cultural Awareness in Nigeria Schools. West African Journal of Archeology, Special Edition, 1982; pp. 60–63.
 The Gandu System in the Economy of Pre-colonial Hausaland. Nigeria Magazine, Vol. 57, 3 & 4 Nov. 1989; pp. 19–55.
 Arms and Armor in the Warfare of Pre-colonial Hausaland. African Study Monographs, Vol. 8, No. 3, 1985; pp. 143–54.
 Biologically Based Warfare in Pre-colonial Nigeria: Science and Technology in African History with Case Studies from Nigeria, Sierra Leone, Zimbabwe and Zambia. Edwin Mallers Press, New York, (Ed.) by Gloria T. Emessgwall, 1992; pp. 23–32.
 Military Technology in Nigeria before 1900. Historical Foundation of Science and Technology in Nigeria, (Ed.) Gloria T. Emessgwall, 1993, USA; pp. 125–136.
 Warfare and Military Architecture Among the Atyap.
 Engineering in Pre-colonial Nigeria: The Construction Fortifications, African Systems of Science, Technology and Art. The Nigerian Experience, Karnak Publishers, London, 1993; pp. 115–124.
 Construction Techniques in African Encyclopaedia of the History of Science, Technology and Medication in Non-Western Cultures. Kluwer Academic Publishers, Netherlands, 1997; pp. 232–5.
 Local History in Post-Independent Africa, Writing African History
 History of Mathematics in Africa: 1986-1999.
 Encyclopedia of the History of Medicine in Non-Western Cultures.
 Pre-colonial Economic History of Nigeria

He started work on the autobiography of Major-Gen. Zamani Lekwot (rtd.), MNI. However, in 2002, he passed away before he could complete the work.

Also, as at the time of his demise, he had about three projects he left uncompleted:
 Heritaɡe of Kano: 1,000 Years of Leɡacy. A project involvinɡ exhibition, durbar, tours and seminars.
 Abuja: History of Federal Capital.

The latest publication in his name, involvinɡ the third parts of his uncompleted projects, is the book titled: A Short History of the Atyap, an 11 chapter, 261 paged book reportedly published posthumously in honor of his memory as an excellent scholarly writer and passionate Atyap man. They canvassed for a fair deal for his people and all ethnic minorities. The book was launched in Abuja, the Nigerian capital, and was well attended by dignitaries, including the former Group Managing Director of the Nigerian National Petroleum Corporation (NNPC), Engr. Andrew Laah Yakubu, co-writers such as Prof. John Edward Philips; former Kaduna State Head of Service, A̠tyoli Akila D. Bungwon; the A̠gwatyap A̠gwam Dominic G. Yahaya (KSM); and the book reviewer, Rev. Fr. William Abbah; amongst others. Another late contributor was Toure Kazah-Toure.

References

1956 births
Academic staff of Ahmadu Bello University
20th-century Nigerian historians
2005 deaths
Atyap people
People from Kaduna